Scoparia subtersa is a moth in the family Crambidae. It was described by Harrison Gray Dyar Jr. in 1929. It is found in Guatemala, Costa Rica, Mexico and Trinidad.

The wingspan is about 14 mm. The forewings are yellowish with pale lines. The hindwings are grey, with bown irrorations (speckles) and blotches. Adults have been recorded on wing in January.

References

Moths described in 1929
Scorparia